Kishore Sahu (22 November 1915 – 22 August 1980) was an Indian actor, film director, screenwriter, and producer. He appeared in 22 films between 1937 and 1980, and he directed 20 films between 1942 and 1974.

His directorial venture Kuwara Baap was one of the winners for the BFJA - Best Indian Films Award for best film for 1943. His film Raja has been called "a milestone of art and skill in motion pictures". His film Veer Kunal was a huge box office success. He directed Dilip Kumar with Kamini Kaushal in Nadiya Ke Paar, which became the sixth highest grossing Indian film of 1948. His 1954 film Mayurpankh was entered into the 1954 Cannes Film Festival, where it was nominated for the Grand Prize of the Festival.
Sawan Aya Re did well commercially, with Baburao Patel of Filmindia remarking in the 9 May 1949 edition that Sahu's estimate had risen due to the "original treatment" he gave to an "otherwise ordinary" story. He was also known for the Meena Kumari starrer, Dil Apna Aur Preet Parai (1960).

He had four children, Vimal Sahu, Naina Sahu, Mamta Sahu, and Rohit Sahu. His wife Preeti was a Kumaoni Brahmin.

Before marrying Preeti, he was briefly married to his Punar Milan (1940) co-star Snehprabha Pradhan before the relationship ended in 1943 after a court battle.

Early life
Sahu was born in present-day Rajnandgaon district in India. His father was the Prime Minister under the Raja of Rajnandgaon. He joined the University of Nagpur and took part in the "freedom struggle",  completing his graduation in 1937. An interest in writing short stories brought him in contact with cinema, where he initially started as an actor.

Filmography

Director
 Kunwara Baap (1942)
 Raja (1943)
 Shararat (1944)
 Veer Kunal (1945)
 Sindoor (1947)
 Sajan (1947)
 Nadiya Ke Par (1948)
 Sawan Aya Re (1949)
 Kali Ghata (1951)
 Mayurpankh (1954)
 Hamlet (1954)
 Kismet Ka Khel (1956)
 Bare Sarkar (1957)
 Dil Apna Aur Preet Parai (1960)
 Grahasti (1963)
 Ghar Basake Dekho (1963)
 Poonam Ki Raat (1965)
 Hare Kanch Ki Chooriyan (1967)
 Pushpanjali (1970)
 Dhuen Ki Lakeer (1974)

Writer

Producer
 Bahurani (1940)
 Sawan Aya Re (1949)
 Hamara Ghar (1950)
 Kali Ghata (1951)
 Mayurpankh (1954)
 Poonam Ki Raat (1965)
 Hare Kanch Ki Chooriyan (1967)
 Pushpanjali (1970)

References

External links

1915 births
1980 deaths
Indian male film actors
Hindi-language film directors
Indian male screenwriters
Hindi film producers
20th-century Indian male actors
People from Raigarh district
20th-century Indian film directors
20th-century Indian screenwriters
20th-century Indian male writers